Hobart City Council (or City of Hobart) is a local government body in Tasmania, covering the central metropolitan area of the state capital, Hobart. The Hobart local government area has a population of 53,684 and includes the suburbs of West Hobart, Lenah Valley, Mount Stuart, South Hobart, New Town, Sandy Bay and most of Fern Tree, North Hobart and Mount Nelson .

History and attributes
The present city council was created in 1852 by act of parliament, and the city mayor raised to Lord Mayor in 1934.

Mount Wellington and the River Derwent are major features of the natural environment of the City of Hobart. 61% of the area is bushland.

Sister cities
  Yaizu, Japan
  L'Aquila, l’Aquila, Abruzzo, Italy

Government

The City of Hobart is governed by the Hobart City Council, consisting of twelve aldermen headed by the Lord Mayor of Hobart. The current Lord Mayor is Anna Reynolds, after winning the 2018 Council Election.  Aldermen are elected every four years.

Localities

Hobart suburbs
•	
•	
•	
•	
•	Hobart city centre
•	
•	
•	
•	
•	
•	
•	
•	
•	
•

Other localities
•	
•	
•	Queens Domain
•	
•

Economy
The Hobart City Council estimates that on weekdays "close to 50% of the population of Greater Hobart would be in the City for working, shopping, education, personal business or leisure purposes".

Major industries by employment:
Health and Community Services 17%
Retail Trade 13%
Property and Business Services 12%
Government Administration 12%
Education 9%

The City has five major hospitals and fire, police, and emergency service headquarters.

Demographics 
Hobart is classified as an urban capital city (UCC) under the Australian Classification of Local Governments.

Coat of arms

See also
List of local government areas of Tasmania

References

External links
Hobart City Council official website
Local Government Association Tasmania
Tasmanian Electoral Commission - local government

Hobart
Geography of Hobart
1842 establishments in Australia
City of Hobart